The 2017 Tour of Utah was a seven-stage road cycling race held from July 31 to August 6, 2017, and the 13th edition of the Tour of Utah. It was rated as a 2.HC on the 2017 UCI America Tour.

Teams
Sixteen teams entered the race. Each team had a maximum of eight riders:

Overview
Stage 1 was won by Ty Magner.

Stage 2 was won by Brent Bookwalter.

Stage 3 was won by Rob Britton.

Stage 4 was won by John Murphy.

Stage 5 was won by Travis McCabe.

Stage 6 was won by Giulio Ciccone.

Stage 7 was won by Marco Canola.

Final classifications

The sprint classification was won by Travis McCabe.

The mountain classification was won by Jacob Rathe.

The youth classification was won by Neilson Powless.

References 

2017
2017 UCI America Tour
2017 in American sports
2017 in sports in Utah
July 2017 sports events in the United States
August 2017 sports events in the United States